Kulltorp is a locality situated in Gnosjö Municipality, Jönköping County, Sweden with 334 inhabitants in 2010.

References 

Populated places in Jönköping County
Populated places in Gnosjö Municipality
Finnveden